The cuneiform sign ni is a common-use sign of the Amarna letters, the Epic of Gilgamesh, and other cuneiform texts. It has a secondary sub-use in the Amarna letters for addressing the Pharaoh, from the vassal states of Canaan. The address to the Pharaoh is often 'King-Lord-Mine': LUGAL, EN-ia which has many varieties of expression. "LUGAL" is Akkadian language for "Šarru", English "king", and EN in Akkadian is bēlu, for "Lord", (thus "King, Lord-Mine"). In some Amarna letters the sub-use of ni is lí, for spelling "bēlu", be-lí often  .

There are other sub-uses of ni (see Epic of Gilgamesh usage below). It is also found in some Amarna letters, EA 9, and EA 252, for example where ni or lí is scribed in a "flourish" format (an over-lengthened version of the two-horizontals that construct the sign), similar to tab, . In EA 9 especially, there is a 'scribe margin line', both left and right on the clay tablet obverse. For the right margin, some words in the lower paragraphs of the obverse (Para 4–7), some words ending with ni/lí, have the sign lengthened, and sitting upon the right margin line-(the cuneiform text, in EA 9, reads: left-to-right).

Epic of Gilgamesh usage
The ni sign usage in the Epic of Gilgamesh is as follows: lí-(5) times, né-(42), ni-(326), ṣal-(8), zal-(1), Ì-(9) times. Ì, the Sumerogram is Akkadian language "šamnu", for English "oil".

Because of its multiple usages in the Epic, ni, or lí, can be used as a syllabic for "
"ne", "ni", or "li"/"lí", etc. It also can be used as a syllabic for combinations related to: "sal", "ṣal", or "zal"; (in Akkadian many consonants, or the 4-vowels, a, e, i, u can be interchanged, for performing the final Akkadian language 'dictionary word').

References

Moran, William L. 1987, 1992. The Amarna Letters. Johns Hopkins University Press, 1987, 1992. 393 pages.(softcover)
 Parpola, 1971. The Standard Babylonian Epic of Gilgamesh, Parpola, Simo, Neo-Assyrian Text Corpus Project, c 1997, Tablet I thru Tablet XII, Index of Names, Sign List, and Glossary-(pp. 119–145), 165 pages.

Cuneiform signs